Stygiolobus rod-shaped virus (SRV), scientific name Azorudivirus SRV, is an archaeal virus and the sole species in the genus Azorudivirus. Its only known host is Stygiolobus archaea.

References

Archaeal viruses
Ligamenvirales